Shí-èr-lǜ (12 pitches) (twelve-pitch scale) was a standardized gamut of twelve notes. Also known, rather misleadingly, as the Chinese chromatic scale, it was one kind of chromatic scale used in ancient Chinese music. The Chinese scale uses the same intervals as the Pythagorean scale, based on 3:2 ratios (8:9, 16:27, 64:81, etc.). The gamut or its subsets were used for tuning and are preserved in bells and pipes.

Unlike the Western chromatic scale, the shí-èr-lǜ was not used as a scale in its own right; it is rather a set of fundamental notes on which other scales were constructed.

The first reference to "standardization of bells and pitch" dates back to around 600 BCE, while the first description of the generation of pitches dates back to around 240 CE.

Note names
 黃鐘 (黄钟) - Huáng Zhōng - tonic/unison - 1 : 1 - 
 大呂 (大吕) - Dà Lǚ - semitone - 37 : 211 - 
 太簇 - Tài Cù - major second - 32 : 23 - 
 夾鐘 (夹钟) - Jiá Zhōng - minor third - 39 : 214 - 
 姑洗 - Gū Xiǎn - major third - 34 : 26 - 
 仲呂 (中吕) - Zhòng Lǚ - perfect fourth - 311 : 217 - 
 蕤賓 (蕤宾) - Ruí Bīn - tritone - 36 : 29 - 
 林鐘 (林钟) - Lín Zhōng - perfect fifth - 3 : 2 - 
 夷則 (夷则) - Yí Zé - minor sixth - 38 : 212 - 
 南呂 (南吕) - Nán Lǚ - major sixth - 33 : 24 - 
 無射 (无射) - Wú Yì - minor seventh - 310 : 215 - 
 應鐘 (应钟) - Yìng Zhōng - major seventh - 35 : 27 - 
There were 12 notes in total, which fall within the scope of one octave. Note that the mathematical method used by the ancient Chinese could never produce a true octave, as the next higher frequency in the series of frequencies produced by the Chinese system would be higher than 880 hertz.

See the article by Chen Ying-shi.

See also
Chinese musicology

Further reading
Reinisch, Richard (?). Chinesische Klassische Musik, p. 30. Books On Demand. .

Sources

External links
Graham Pont. "Philosophy and Science of Music in Ancient Greece: The Predecessors of Pythagoras and their Contribution", Nexus Network Journal.

3-limit tuning and intervals
Chinese music
Chromaticism
Musical scales